Kiam or KIAM may refer to:

People
 Omar Kiam (1894–1954), American costume and fashion designer.
 Song Hoot Kiam (1830–1900), Singaporean community leader
 Victor Kiam (1926–2001), American entrepreneur

Other
 11011 KIAM, asteroid
 KIAM (AM), a radio station (630 AM) licensed to Nenana, Alaska, United States
 KIAM-FM, a radio station (91.9 FM) licensed to North Nenana, Alaska, United States
 Kiam Building, a building in Houston, Texas, United States